Mylothris sagala, the dusky dotted border or lemon dotted border, is a butterfly in the family Pieridae. It is found in Ethiopia, Kenya, Tanzania, the Democratic Republic of the Congo, Rwanda, Malawi, Zambia and Zimbabwe. The habitat consists of submontane and montane forests.

Adults have a weak flight. They feed on the nectar of various flowers. Adults have been recorded on wing in August, September, December and from February to May.

The larvae feed on Loranthus freisiorum, Erianthemum dregei, Oncocalyx fischeri, Oncocalyx sulfureus, Phragmanthera usuiensis, Englerina, Agelanthus and Viscum species.

Subspecies
M. s. sagala (Tanzania)
M. s. albissima Talbot, 1944 (south-western Tanzania, northern Zambia, Democratic Republic of the Congo: Shaba, Lomami)
M. s. dentatus Butler, 1896 (Malawi, north-eastern Zambia, Tanzania: Udzungwa Mountains)
M. s. mahale Kielland, 1990 (Tanzania)
M. s. mayenceae Berger, 1987 (Rwanda)
M. s. narcissus Butler, 1888 (south-eastern Kenya, Tanzania: Mount Kilimanjaro)
M. s. neumanni Sharpe, 1896 (central highlands of Kenya)
M. s. oldeanensis Kielland, 1990 (north-eastern Tanzania)
M. s. seminigra d’Abrera, 1980 (Tanzania: Uluguru Mountains)
M. s. swaynei Butler, 1899 (highlands of Ethiopia)
M. s. umtaliana d’Abrera, 1980 (eastern border of Zimbabwe, western border of Mozambique)

References

Seitz, A. Die Gross-Schmetterlinge der Erde 13: Die Afrikanischen Tagfalter. Plate XIII 11
Seitz, A. Die Gross-Schmetterlinge der Erde 13: Die Afrikanischen Tagfalter. Plate XIII 12

Butterflies described in 1886
Pierini
Butterflies of Africa
Taxa named by Henley Grose-Smith